Haji Mohammad Yousuf Wafa is an Afghan Taliban politician who is currently serving as  Governor of Kandahar Province since August 2021 and as the acting Governor of Balkh since March 2023.

References

Year of birth missing (living people)
Living people
Taliban governors
Governors of Kandahar Province
Place of birth missing (living people)